Hartwick Historic District is a national historic district located at Hartwick in Otsego County, New York.  The district encompasses 149 contributing buildings and 1 contributing site in the hamlet of Hartwick.  The buildings date from about 1800 through the 1960s, and include representative examples of popular architectural styles.  Notable buildings include the Christian Church (1853, 1879), Methodist Church (1839), First Baptist Church (1856), Hartwick Coal and Feed Co. (1901), and former Harwick High School (1921).

It was listed on the National Register of Historic Places in 2013.

References

Historic districts on the National Register of Historic Places in New York (state)
Buildings and structures in Otsego County, New York
National Register of Historic Places in Otsego County, New York